Roderick Alan Fitzjohn MacMillan (2 May 1928 – August 2006), known as John MacMillan, was a British rower.

Rowing career
He competed in the men's coxed four event at the 1952 Summer Olympics.

He represented England and won a silver medal in the eights and a bronze medal in the coxed fours at the 1954 British Empire and Commonwealth Games in Vancouver, Canada.

References

External links
 

1928 births
2006 deaths
British male rowers
Olympic rowers of Great Britain
Rowers at the 1952 Summer Olympics
Commonwealth Games medallists in rowing
Commonwealth Games silver medallists for England
Commonwealth Games bronze medallists for England
Place of birth missing
Rowers at the 1954 British Empire and Commonwealth Games
Medallists at the 1954 British Empire and Commonwealth Games